The Legend of Gingko is a 2000 South Korean film starring Choi Jin-sil.

Story 
Caught in between an ethnic war, Bee struggles between love and death.

Cast

External links 
 
 

2000 films
2000s Korean-language films
South Korean fantasy films
South Korean action adventure films
2000s South Korean films